Judd mat Gaardebounen is a savory dish of smoked pork collar and broad beans which is one of the most widely recognized national dishes of Luxembourg. It is associated with the village of Gostingen in the south-east of the country where the inhabitants have earned the nickname of Bounepatscherten as a result of their well-known broad beans.

Preparation

After being soaked in water overnight, the cured (or smoked) pork collar is boiled and skimmed, then allowed to simmer with leeks, carrots, celery and cloves for about two hours. A bouquet garni should be included, together with a glass of Moselle wine. For the beans, blanched in water for 5 minutes, a sauce is prepared. Chopped onion, bacon cubes and flour are browned in butter in a saucepan, meat stock is stirred in and the sauce, which should be fairly liquid, is left to simmer for some 20 minutes. The blanched beans are added to the sauce together with finely ground fresh savoury, pepper and salt. When the pork is ready, it is removed from the broth, sliced and arranged on a large plate with the beans. The dish can be served with boiled potatoes and either wine or beer.

Etymology
The origin of the word "judd" is not clear. One possibility, suggested by the linguist Jean-Claude Muller, a member of Luxembourg's Institut grand-ducal, is that it comes from the Spanish word for bean (judía). He explains that in Galicia, there is also a pork dish served with broad beans which is locally called judia pronounced "shu-DI-a". Muller theorizes that the dish was brought to Luxembourg by Spanish troops during the 16th or 17th century. If that indeed is the case, then "Judd mat Gaardebounen" approximates to "Beans with Beans". It has also been argued that the term derives from the Jew (judío) because "the dark color of the beans reminded some of the dark skin of the Spanish Jews".

See also

 List of pork dishes
 Luxembourg cuisine

References

Luxembourgian cuisine
Pork dishes
Legume dishes
National dishes